The National Office of Electoral Processes (Oficina Nacional de Procesos Electorales, ONPE) is the body in charge of organizing elections in Peru. Created in 1993, during the government of Alberto Fujimori, it is headquartered in the Lima District in Lima. Its current National Chief is Manuel Cox Ganoza.

ONPE is an autonomous body of the State, and it forms the electoral system of Peru, along with the National Jury of Elections and the National Registry of Identification and Civil Status.

Functions 

1. Organizing all electoral processes, referendums and other popular consultations.
Thus, ONPE has the duty, whenever the President of Peru calls for elections, to organize them and guarantee their transparency and legitimacy.
2. Designing the voting ballots, electoral acts, forms and any other relevant material, in order to ensure the respect for the citizen's will.
 ONPE is also in charge of carrying out lotteries to determine the order of candidates or options on the respective ballot.

Organization 

1. Chief
2. Advisor Cabinet Chief
3. Information and Electoral Education Manager
4. Electoral Administration Manager
5. Supervision of Party Funds Manager
6. General Secretaríat
7. Juridical Counsel Manager
8. Planning and Electoral Development Manager
9. Systems and Electoral Informatics Manager
10. Administration and Finance Manager
11. Electoral Upbringing and Training Manager
12. Electoral Organization and Regional Coordination Manager
13. Institutional Control Manager
14. Public Barrister

Mission
To ensure the respect for the popular will, to promote the free electoral participation by the citizens, to contribute to the democratic consolidation of the country.

Vision 
To be the maximum and autonomous authority, specialized in planning, organization and execution of electoral processes, and a model within the region for its technology and innovative electoral mechanisms.

See also 
 Elections in Peru

External links

 National Office of Electoral Processes

Peru
Government of Peru
Elections in Peru